The Sheriff In Town is a 2017 South Korean crime comedy film directed by Kim Hyung-ju. The film stars Lee Sung-min, Cho Jin-woong and Kim Sung-kyun.

Plot
Dae-ho is an ex-cop who is forced to quit his job when an impulsive bust left his partner stabbed and a major felon on the run. Five years have passed since that incident, and now Dae-ho runs a humble restaurant in his hometown Gijang. Never one to question his own superior strength, smarts and righteousness, Dae-ho has appointed himself the unofficial "sheriff" of the village, and assembled a dubious posse of locals to keep an eye on things. So when a face from Dae-ho's past re-emerges, claiming to have left crime behind and promising great things for the town, Dae-ho has his suspicions, and he is going to act on them.

Cast
Lee Sung-min as Dae-ho
Cho Jin-woong as Jong-jin 
Kim Sung-kyun as Duk-man 
Kim Jong-soo as Yong-hwan
Jo Woo-jin as Seon-cheol 
Lim Hyun-sung as Kang-gon
Bae Jung-nam as Choon-mo
Kim Hye-eun as Mi-seon
Kim Byeong-ok as Chief Kang
Kim Kwang-gyoo as Subsection chief Park
Hiromitsu Takeda as Takeshi 
Son Yeo-eun as Hee-soon 
Kim Jae-young as Kwak Jeon-moo
Kang Eun-ah as Na-yeong 
Noh Kang-min as Seung-hyeon
Choi Moon-kyung as Detective Jo's wife
Jung Man-sik as Il-sik (cameo)
Kim Jong-goo as Seon-cheol's father (special appearance)
Joo Jin-mo as Ship captain Park (special appearance)
Lee Il-jae as Deputy assistant commissioner (special appearance)
Baek Seung-hyeon as Detective Jo (special appearance)
Kim Hong-pa as Real estate director Yoon (special appearance)

References

External links

2010s crime comedy films
South Korean crime comedy films
Lotte Entertainment films
2017 comedy films
2010s South Korean films